A historiated initial is an initial, an enlarged letter at the beginning of a paragraph or other section of text, that contains a picture. Strictly speaking, a historiated initial depicts an identifiable figure or a specific scene, while an inhabited initial contains figures (human or animal) that are decorative only, without forming a subject. Both sorts became very common and elaborate in luxury illuminated manuscripts. These illustrated initials were first seen in the Insular art of the early 8th century. The earliest known example is in the Saint Petersburg Bede, an Insular manuscript of 731–46, and the Vespasian Psalter has another.

The size and decoration of the initial further gives clues to both its importance and location. Letters that began a new section of a text or a particularly noteworthy section might receive more flourishes and space. They would also provide a visual point of reference, "marking the division of the text into books, chapters, paragraphs and sometimes even verses" since, due to the price of parchment, new sections did not necessarily begin on a new page. In luxury manuscripts an entire page might be devoted to a historiated initial. 

Both the size and the ostentatiousness of a manuscript reflect both on the status of the manuscript and on its owner. Manuscripts meant for everyday use, typically by friars or university students, often had little illumination, and hardly any elaborate historiated initials or flourishes. Manuscripts commissioned by wealthy patrons or for a wealthy monastery were often  illuminated, and in gold or silver rather than pen and ink.

See also
Calligraphy
Insular script
Insular illumination
Letras y figuras
List of Irish manuscripts
Lombardic capitals
Miniature (illuminated manuscript)

References

Bibliography

External links

 35 historiated initials from the Huntington Library
 Historiated Initial from the "Song of Songs"
 "Making of Illuminated Manuscripts" from the Encyclopedia of Irish and World Art
 "Decoration and Illumination" from Manuscript Studies: Medieval and Early Modern
 100,000 printed initials (1470–1700) at Flickr.com

Iconography of illuminated manuscripts
Book design
Iconography
Visual motifs